The HP-32S was a programmable RPN Scientific Calculator introduced by Hewlett-Packard in 1988 and discontinued in 1991.  It continued the tradition of the HP-15C programmable RPN Scientific Calculator. But some functions of the HP-15C were omitted (matrix calculations) and some were reduced in functionality (complex calculations), so to some extent it is more correct to say that the HP-32S expanded upon the HP-34C.  It supported complex math, statistics, probability, and other functions.

HP-32SII 

The HP-32SII added algebraic math, fractions and a second shift key.  This was introduced in 1991 and discontinued in 2002.

Sample program 
  ; This is an HP-32Sii version of the Euclidean algorithm
  ; to find the greatest common divisor (GCD).
  ; You run this by putting the two numbers for
  ; which you want to find the GCD and pressing "XEQ E"
  E01 LBL E
  E02 STO A
  F01 LBL F
  F02 ÷
  F03 FP
  F04 RCL A
  F05 x
  F06 1
  F07 x>y?
  F08 GTO G
  F09 R(DOWN)
  F10 PSE
  F11 x<>A
  F12 RCL A
  F13 GTO F
  G01 LBL G
  G02 RCL A
  G03 RTN

See also
 HP calculators
 List of Hewlett-Packard pocket calculators

External links 
 HP's HP-32SII Page
 The HP Museum's HP-32S Page
 HP-32S and HP-32S II pictures on MyCalcDB (database about 70's and 80's pocket calculators)
HP-32S on Porter Electronics (Website where they are still available)

32s
32S